Square One Publishers is a publishing company, founded in 2000 by Rubin "Rudy" Shur, a former Avery Publishing president. Rudy Shur serves as the Chief Executive Officer. Their offices are located in Garden City, New York, home to other publisher's offices. In April 2016, Square One Publishers acquired Ocean Publishing, located in Flageler Beach, Florida, with the intent to keep the Ocean Publishing name as an imprint. Later that year, Square One Publishers acquired the rights to five novels by James Misko, marking the entry into fictional titles.

Partial bibliography
 The Acid Alkaline Food Guide, Susan Brown & Larry Trivieri (2013) 
 Bushido, The Way of the Samurai, Yamamoto Tsunetomo, Translated by Justin F. Stone and Minoru Tanaka, 2003, 
 Dressed to Kill: The Link between Breast Cancer and Bras, Sydney Ross Singer and Soma Grismaijer (2017) 
 How Smart Is Your Baby?, Glenn Doman & Janet Doman (2006) 
 How to Read a Person Like a Book,  Gerard Nierenberg, Henry Calero, & Gabriel Grayson (2010) 
 Love Tactics, Thomas McKnight & Robert Phillips (2002) 
 Pat Cooper: How Dare You Say How Dare Me!, Rich Herschlag (2010) 
 Pea in a Pod, Linda Goldberg (2011) 
 Suicide by Sugar, Nancy Appleton (2008) 
 Taking Woodstock: A True Story of a Riot, a Concert and a Life, Elliot Tiber with Tom Monte (2007) 
 After Woodstock: The True Story of a Belgian Movie, an Israeli Wedding, and a Manhattan Breakdown, Elliot Tiber (2015) 
 Talking With Your Hands, Listening With Your Eyes, Gabriel Grayson (2003) 
 The Urban Treasure Hunter, Michael Chaplan (2004) 
 What You Must Know About Vitamins, Minerals, Herbs & More, Pamela Wartian Smith (2007)

References

Book publishing companies of the United States
Garden City, New York